"Have I Told You Lately That I Love You?" is a popular song written by Scotty Wiseman for the 1944 musical film, Sing, Neighbor, Sing and performed by Lulu Belle and Scotty. It was their greatest hit and one of the first country music songs to attract major attention in the pop music field. Although the song was featured in the movie, it was not released by Lulu Belle and Scotty until 1947 (and then again in 1956). The first released version of this song was by Gene Autry in 1945.

Bing Crosby and the Andrews Sisters version

Bing Crosby and the Andrews Sisters recorded the song on November 25, 1949 and it had a good reception from the trade magazine Billboard who said: "Ditty’s a sprightly mountain-musiker that had its innings a couple of years back on straight hillbilly diskings. Bing and the gals are in top form as they harmonize it to a spanking fare-thee-well." The record entered the Billboard charts on January 21, 1950 and in a four-week stay it peaked at No. 24.

Lulu Belle and Scotty version

Lulu Belle and Scotty released their version in 1956 on a Mercury Records 45 rpm single.

Elvis Presley version
The earliest and easily most prominent recording of "Have I Told You Lately That I Love You" in the early rock era was by Elvis Presley. According to the book of the CD-boxset "Elvis - The Complete 50's Masters", Presley recorded it on January 19, 1957, at RCA's Radio Recorders in Hollywood for his Loving You album. Session musicians for the song included Presley himself on acoustic guitar, Scotty Moore on electric guitar, Bill Black on double bass, D. J. Fontana on drums, Dudley Brooks on piano, Hoyt Hawkins on organ, and the Jordanaires on background vocals. When the song was included on the Loving You album release in July 1957, it immediately prompted both Ricky Nelson and Eddie Cochran to record cover versions of the song. Nelson's was the "B" side of a hit single ("Be-Bop Baby", released in September), while Cochran's was an album cut (released in November). The impact of the Elvis version was felt across the Atlantic.

Eddie Cochran version

Eddie Cochran recorded his version in August 1957 and released it on the album Singin' to My Baby. Musicians on the session were:

 Eddie Cochran - guitars, ukulele, vocals
 Perry Botkin Sr. - rhythm guitar
 Connie "Guybo" Smith - double bass
 The Johnny Mann Chorus - backing vocals

Other versions

Rosalie Allen
Ricky Nelson on his 1957 album 'Ricky' Imperial LP 9048 USA and the B-side to "Be-Bop Baby"
Eddy Arnold
Gene Autry – one of the first recorded versions of this song, which went to number 3 on the C&W charts in 1946. For many years it was the standard, and still is to many people today.
The Beau Marks
The Blue Diamonds (Netherlands, 1961) 
Jim Ed Brown
Anita Bryant
Michael Bublé (2013) with Naturally 7 - included in the album To Be Loved.
The Canadian Sweethearts
Tommy Collins
Jill Corey
Floyd Cramer
Bob Hope with Bing Crosby (This was a parodied version which was used in Crosby's radio show on February 1, 1950.) 
Vic Damone
Skeeter Davis and Porter Wagoner
Little Jimmy Dickens
Don Edwards
George Faith
Red Foley (1947)
Billy Fury
Stonewall Jackson
Jerry Lee Lewis
Vera Lynn
Al Martino - included in his album "Painted, Tainted Rose" (1963).
Susan McCann
Willie Nelson (on his 1967 album Make Way for Willie Nelson)
Patti Page - included in her album "Patti Page Sings Country and Western Golden Hits" (1961)
Freddy Quinn
Jim Reeves - included in the album "Have I Told You Lately That I Love You?" (1964).
Cliff Richard (on his 1965 album Love is Forever album)
Riders in the Sky
Riders of the Purple Sage
Tex Ritter (1946)
Marty Robbins - included in his album "The Songs of Robbins" (1957 Columbia Records) and "Have I Told You Lately That I Love You?" (1974).
Johnny Rodriguez
The Sons of the Pioneers
Sissy Spacek (on her 1983 album Hangin' Up My Heart)
Ringo Starr (on his 1970 album Sentimental Journey)
Hank Thompson
Wesley Tuttle 1946
Billy Vaughn and His Orchestra
Bobby Vinton
Porter Wagoner
Patrick Wall
Kitty Wells
Slim Whitman
Roger Whittaker
Hank Williams
Mac Wiseman
Faron Young
Dale Evans and Roy Rogers
Pat and Shirley Boone - included in their album "I Love You Truly" (1962).

The Overtones - On their first album, Good Ol' Fashioned Love

Charting versions

References

External links
Scotty Wiseman at Nashville Songwriters Hall of Fame

1945 songs
1956 singles
Eddie Cochran songs
Gene Autry songs
Kitty Wells songs
Red Foley songs
Ricky Nelson songs
Tex Ritter songs
Bob Hope songs
Liberty Records singles
Mercury Records singles